Segregation may refer to:

Separation of people
 Geographical segregation, rates of two or more populations which are not homogenous throughout a defined space
 School segregation 
 Housing segregation
 Racial segregation, separation of humans into racial groups in daily life
 Racial segregation in the United States, a specific period in U.S. history
 Religious segregation, the separation of people according to their religion
 Residential segregation, the physical separation of two or more groups into different neighbourhoods
 Sex segregation, the physical, legal, and cultural separation of people according to their biological sex
 Occupational segregation, the distribution of people based upon demographic characteristics, most often gender, both across and within occupations and jobs
 Age segregation, separation of people based on their age and may be observed in many aspects of some societies
 Health segregation. Segregation by health condition. People of different skin colors weren't able to have the same proffesion/field of work.

Separation of objects
 Segregation in materials, enrichment of a material constituent at a free surface or an internal interface of a material
 Particle segregation, tendency of particulate solids to segregate by size, density, shape, and other properties
 Magnetic-activated cell sorting, a method for separation of various cell populations depending on their surface antigens

Other uses
 Segregate (taxonomy), created when a taxon is split off from another taxon
 Chromosome segregation, the process that occurs during cell division whereby chromosomes separate and migrate to opposite ends of the cell
 Mendel's law of segregation, observation in Mendelian inheritance that each parent passes only one allele to its offspring
 Security segregation, regulatory rules requiring that customer assets be held separate from assets of a brokerage firm, on the broker's books
 Segregated cycle facilities, marked lanes, tracks, shoulders and paths designated for use by bicyclists
 Trail segregation, the practice of designating certain trails as having a specific preferred or exclusive use

See also
 
 
 Segment (disambiguation)
 Separate (disambiguation)